Devalthal is a tehsil of Pithoragarh District in Uttarakhand state, in northern India. It has an estimated population of 12,000, and has a treasury, bank, post office, government, private school, rest house.

The name Devalthal is derived from two words, Dev (male god) and sthal (place to live), which translates to Land of the Gods. It is situated on Pithoragarh-Thal state Highway. Devalthal is situated in a large valley, temples of many Folk & Hindu god & goddesses are situated here, like Lori Mallikarjun, Dektya Bhagwati, Nandanevi in Hardyo, Dharamghar, Maleynath and others. It is the gateway to Eastern Himalayas. Panchachuli is visible from here. Soap stone mines are also found here.

It has developed a lot in last few years with a hospital, a degree college and other basic facilities present there.

References

Villages in Pithoragarh district
Tehsils of India

देवलथल क्षेत्र मुख्यतः बाराबीसी के अंतर्गत आता है, पहले यहा लोग गिनती के रूप में 20(बीस) तक का ही उपयोग करते थे जैसे एक बीसी, दो बीसी! इस प्रकार इसमे 240 गांव आते है जो 12  बीसी है अर्थात 12×20 =240! kewalyhaphle